Kamni Vrh pri Primskovem is a small settlement in the hills southeast of Šmartno pri Litiji in central Slovenia. The surrounding area, known as Primskovo, is part of the historical region of Lower Carniola. The Municipality of Šmartno pri Litiji is now included in the Central Slovenia Statistical Region.

References

External links
Kamni Vrh pri Primskovem at Geopedia

Populated places in the Municipality of Šmartno pri Litiji